Nisha, meaning "night" in Sanskrit (निशा, nishā), is an Indian female given name, and may refer to:

People
Nisha Noor (1962-2007), Indian actress
Nisha Ganatra (born 1974), Canadian director, writer 
Nisha Patel-Nasri (1977–2006), murdered British policewoman
Nisha Rajagopal (born 1980), Carnatic singer
Nisha Agarwal (born 1989), Indian actress
Nisha Adhikari (born 1986), Nepali actress
Nisha Warsi (born 1995), field hockey player

Characters

Film and television
Nisha Bains, a station café waitress on Postman Pat, a BBC stop motion animated children's television series aimed at pre-school children
Nisha Chopra, a character played by Juhi Chawla in the 1999 film Arjun Pandit
Nisha Choudhury, a character played by Madhuri Dixit in the 1994 Bollywood film  Hum Aapke Hain Koun..!
Nisha Patel / Nisha Kumar, a character played by Mumtaz in the 1971 film Tere Mere Sapne
Nisha Thappar, a character played by Karisma Kapoor in the 2001 film Ek Rishtaa: The Bond of Love
Nisha, a character in the 2003 Pakistani film Pyar Hi Pyar Mein
Nisha, a character played by Raveena Tandon in the 2000 Indian film Kahin Pyaar Na Ho Jaaye
Nisha, a character played by Supriya Pathak in the 1983 film Bekaraar
Nisha, a character played by Sunetra Sarker in Brookside,  a soap opera based in Liverpool that first aired in 1982
Nisha, a character played by Preity Zinta in Koi... Mil Gaya (2003), and again in Krrish (2006), a Bollywood science fiction film
Nisha, a character played by Karisma Kapoor Dil To Pagal Hai a 1997 Bollywood comedy-drama
Nisha, a character played by Mumtaz in the 1971 film Kathputli
Nisha, a character played by Manisha Koirala in the 1993 film Insaniyat Ke Devta
Nisha, a character played by Neelima Azim in the 1995 film Zamaana Deewana
Nisha, a character played by Sonali Bendre in the 1998 film Major Saab
Nisha, a character played by Sonali Bendre in the 2000 film Dhai Akshar Prem Ke
Nisha, a character played by Shilpa Shetty in the 1996 film Himmat
Nisha, a character played by Mahima Chaudhry in the 1999 film Pyaar Koi Khel Nahin
Nisha, a character played by Himani Shivpuri in the film Anjaam
Nisha, a character played by Tamannaah in the 2010 Tamil film Thillalangadi
Nisha, a character played by Varalaxmi Sarathkumar in the 2012 Tamil film Podaa Podi
Nisha, a character played by Esha Gupta in the 2013 film Gori Tere Pyaar Mein
Nisha, a character played by Kajal Agarwal in the 2012 Tamil film Thuppakki
Nisha, a character played by Nikki Galrani in the 2015 Tamil film Darling

Video games
Nisha the Lawbringer, a playable character in the 2014 video game Borderlands: The Pre-Sequel
Nisha Roberts, a playable character in the video game The Art of the Heist

Other
 Cyclone Nisha, several tropical cyclones
Nisha Nimantran, a poem by the Indian poet Harivansh Rai Bachchan

Indian feminine given names